Planpyrgiscus is a genus of sea snails, marine gastropod mollusks in the family Pyramidellidae, the pyrams and their allies.

Species
Species within the genus Planpyrgiscus include:
 † Planpyrgiscus disparilis Laws, 1940
 † Planpyrgiscus extenuatus (Marwick, 1931)
 Planpyrgiscus lawsi Dell, 1956

References

External links
 To World Register of Marine Species
 Spencer H.G., Willan R.C., Marshall B.A. & Murray T.J. (2011). Checklist of the Recent Mollusca Recorded from the New Zealand Exclusive Economic Zone

Pyramidellidae